Skoki  is a village in the administrative district of Gmina Czemierniki, within Radzyń Podlaski County, Lublin Voivodeship, in eastern Poland.

References

Villages in Radzyń Podlaski County